Allen E. Paul (born March 30, 1945) is a former Republican member of the Indiana Senate, representing the 27th District from 1986 until his retirement in 2014. He attended Parsons College and was a delegate to Indiana's Republican State Convention from 1972 to 1986. In 2005, Paul voted for Indiana's recognition of daylight saving time in Committee, though he indicated he was actually opposed to the measure.

References

External links
Virtual Office of Senator Allen Paul official Indiana State Legislature site
 

1945 births
Living people
Republican Party Indiana state senators